The Women's 200 Backstroke at the 11th FINA World Aquatics Championships was swum 29 – 30 July 2005 in Montreal, Quebec, Canada. It was the longest of the 3 backstroke events for women at the 2005 Worlds. Preliminary and Semifinals heats were swum 29 July, with the Final heat on 30 July. The top 16 finishers from Prelims advanced to swim again in Semifinals; the top 8 swimmers in Semifinals advanced to swim a third time in the Final.

At the start of the event, the existing World (WR) and Championships (CR) records were:
WR: 2:06.62, Krisztina Egerszegi (Hungary), swum 25 August 1991 in Athens, Greece
CR: 2:07.40, Cihong He (China), swum 11 September 1994 in Rome, Italy

Results

Preliminaries

Semifinals

Final

References

Swimming at the 2005 World Aquatics Championships
2005 in women's swimming